Misamis Occidental Aquamarine Park is a tropical resort and a prominent habitat for various marine mammals in Mindanao, Philippines. Located in the boundaries of municipalities of Tudela, Misamis Occidental and Sinacaban, Misamis Occidental. Currently, it features a wildlife park that houses a wide array of animals, most are native to the Philippines. It also features hotel accommodations of hut-style suite cottages that line the mangroves. There is a restaurant located within the park itself.

Currently, the Dolphin Island is undergoing rehabilitation and temporarily closed to visitors until further notice.

Amenities

Getting There
The aquamarine park is readily accessible by air either via Labo Airport in nearby Ozamiz City (22 minutes away) or Dipolog Airport (2 hours and 30 minutes away) which serves the nearby Zamboanga del Norte province. Both airports have domestic flights to and from Manila and Cebu. There are also direct transfer flights via the Manila's Ninoy Aquino International Airport that readily connect the park to other destinations in the world.

References

External links
 Homepage of MOAP
 Philippinenportal Pictures
 http://www.the-philippines.de/mindanao-moap-aquamarine-park/
 More Pictures and Information (German)

Resorts in the Philippines
Geography of Misamis Occidental
Tourist attractions in Misamis Occidental
Misamis Occidental
Marine parks of the Philippines